The superior tympanic artery is a small artery in the head. It is a branch of the middle meningeal artery. On entering the cranium it runs in the canal for the tensor tympani muscle and supplies this muscle and the lining membrane of the canal.

References

Arteries of the head and neck